Frankfurt (Oder)-Neuberesinchen station is a railway station in the Neuberesinchen district of the town of Frankfurt (Oder), located in Brandenburg, Germany.

References

External links

Railway stations in Brandenburg
Railway stations in Germany opened in 2000
Buildings and structures in Frankfurt (Oder)